The Feake–Ferris House (also known as the Ross Ferris House) at 181 Shore Road in Old Greenwich, Connecticut was purportedly built around 1645 and was expanded over time to its present saltbox shape. The house was tested by dendrochronologists at Columbia University's Lamont–Doherty Earth Observatory. The client, Greenwich Point Conservancy (GPC), has not yet released the results of the study, but claims that the west side of the house dates to circa 1645, the north lean-to addition made by Jeffrey Ferris to 1660, and the east side and expansion of the lean-to the James Ferris expansion of 1689. According to the Conservancy, as reported in Greenwich Free Press, the outermost rings of one summer beam dated to 1610, but due to the lack of sapwood in the sample, the precise date of the beam is unknown (but possibly 1640 or perhaps the 1680s). Historian Missy Wolf researched the land's title history dating back to Feake.

History

In 1640 Elizabeth Fones Winthrop Feake and Lt. Robert Feake purchased "Elizabeth's Neck" (Greenwich Point) from Native American tribe members. Shortly after the purchase the Feakes likely began construction of a fieldstone cellar dug into a hill overlooking Greenwich Cove possibly serving as a makeshift home for their family. Around 1645, the Feakes constructed a post and beam one-room-over-one-room house on top of the cellar. After the Feakes' divorce, Elizabeth Feake sold the property to Jeffrey Ferris in 1653. Around 1660 Jeffrey Ferris added a lean-to to the back of the house giving the house its saltbox shape. In 1689 Ferris' son, James Ferris, constructed the final major addition, to the right side of house, leaving the house with a two-over-two form and extended lean-to, and Ferris installed new windows, one of which has survived intact and was discovered during the 2018 restoration. It is one of the earliest surviving two-sash windows in America.

The Ferris family owned the house for several centuries. Jeffrey Ferris' great-grandson, James, was a Revolutionary War veteran of the Battle of White Plains (1776) and owned the house when it allegedly suffered damage from British cannon fire, as evidenced by cannon ball marks left on several rafters. James' daughter Hannah inherited the house in the early 1800s. By the mid-1800s Ammi Roswell Ferris (also known as "Ross") (1837-1914) owned the house and ran a tollgate at the causeway to Greenwich Point, possibly collecting "a toll from people who were going to gather scallops and clams at Greenwich Point." In 1951 Laura M. Boles and Bertha Boles acquired the property, and in 1968 Laura Boles' executors sold the house to Elizabeth F. Slater in 1968.  In 1971 Elizabeth Slater sold it to the Lueder family who owned the house for "nearly 40 years" before selling it to the Waters family.

Preservation

In 2014 before the age of the structure was discovered, the dilapidated house was nearly demolished and replaced with a newer building by a recent buyer, but through the efforts of local preservationists, its history was uncovered, and the demolition process came to a halt. After determining the house's age using dendrochronology and record research, the Greenwich Point Conservancy restored the house in 2018 working together with the private owners, the Waters family, who also constructed a large addition adjacent to the original structure. The house remains privately owned and is possibly the oldest inhabited house in the United States, but is open at least once a year to the public by an easement agreement with the Greenwich Point Conservancy.

See also
 Elizabeth Fones
 List of the oldest buildings in Connecticut

References

Houses in Greenwich, Connecticut
Houses completed in 1645
Saltbox architecture in Connecticut